Jens Flemming Patz (born 25 June 1967) is a Swedish curler and curling coach.

He is a two-time Swedish mixed curling champion (1991, 2006).

Teams

Men's

Mixed

Record as a coach of national teams

Personal life
Flemming Patz is from well a known Swedish family of curlers, which includes his brother Rickard Hallström (who is also a coach), his sister Susanne, and his son Johannes .

References

External links
 
 

Living people
1967 births
Swedish male curlers
Swedish curling champions
Swedish curling coaches